The Chaotic Wrestling (CW) Light Heavyweight Championship was a professional wrestling title in American independent promotion Chaotic Wrestling. The title was first won by Short Sleeve Sampson in Andover, Massachusetts on April 21, 2001. There have been a total of 4 recognized individual champions, who have had a combined 4 official reigns. On February 16, 2002, after being unified with the CW Television Championship, Dukes Dalton retires both titles after winning the New England Championship.

Title history

References

External links
Chaotic Wrestling Light Heavyweight Championship Title History
 CW Light Heavyweight Championship

Chaotic Wrestling championships
Light heavyweight wrestling championships